On 4 July 1989, a pilotless MiG-23 jet fighter of the Soviet Air Forces crashed into a house in Kortrijk, Belgium, killing one person. The pilot had ejected over an hour earlier near Kołobrzeg, Poland, after experiencing technical problems, but the aircraft continued flying for around  before running out of fuel and descending into the ground.

History of the flight 

The incident started as a routine training flight. Colonel Nikolai Skuridin, the pilot, was to fly a MiG-23M from the Bagicz Airbase near Kołobrzeg, Poland. During takeoff, the engine's afterburner failed, causing a partial loss of power. However, the engine kept running and the aircraft remained airborne, flying on autopilot in a westerly direction.

The unmanned aircraft left Polish airspace, crossing into East Germany and then West Germany, where it was intercepted by a pair of F-15s from the 32nd Tactical Fighter Squadron of the United States Air Forces Europe, stationed at Soesterberg Air Base in the Netherlands. The F-15 pilots reported that the MiG had no crew.

The MiG-23 crossed into Dutch airspace and continued into Belgium. The escorting F-15s were instructed to shoot down the plane over the North Sea, but as the MiG ran out of fuel, it started a slow turn to the south, prompting the French Air Force to put its fighters on alert.

Political aftermath 

The Belgian government made a formal protest to the Soviet Union for the lack of notification about the stray aircraft. The Belgian Foreign Minister Mark Eyskens expressed concern that "from the time the MiG-23 was first picked up on NATO radar to the time it crashed more than an hour later, no word of warning came from the Soviet side," and that "there was also a 'notable slowness' on the part of the Soviets in disclosing whether the jet was carrying nuclear or toxic weapons."

References

External links 
 Graphics of the flight (newspaper Libération, description  in French)
 CBS News report synopsis from the Vanderbilt Television News Archive (accessible only for associates)

Aviation accidents and incidents in 1989
Aviation accidents and incidents in Belgium
Aviation accidents and incidents caused by fuel exhaustion
Accidents and incidents involving military aircraft
1989 in Belgium
1989 in the Soviet Union
Belgium–Soviet Union relations
Diplomatic incidents
July 1989 events in Europe